Austroaeschna multipunctata is a species of large dragonfly in the family Telephlebiidae, 
known as the multi-spotted darner. 
It inhabits small mountain streams in southern New South Wales and eastern Victoria, Australia.

Austroaeschna multipunctata is a very dark dragonfly with pale markings.

Gallery

See also
 List of dragonflies of Australia

References

Telephlebiidae
Odonata of Australia
Endemic fauna of Australia
Taxa named by René Martin
Insects described in 1901